Dog shit may refer to:

 Feces
 "Dog Shit", a song by Wu-Tang Clan from their 1997 album Wu-Tang Forever